Churchill School is a public, day and boarding school for boys aged 12 to 19 located in the Eastlea suburb of Harare, Zimbabwe. The school had the first school pipe band in Zimbabwe and produces cricket players of national and international calibre.

At one time, the school's pipe band was in the Guinness Book of Records for the longest piping hours. Pipers Neville Workman, Patrick Forth, Paul Harris and Clive Higgins blew their pipes for a combined 100 hours in July 1976, breaking the previous record of eighty hours. It has also produced Legendary athletes like Fabian Muyaba who was the 13th fastest in the world during the early 90s and the fastest in Zimbabwe that time.

History
Founded in 1950 as Eastlea Boys' High School, headmaster E.J. 'Jeeves' Hougaard helped inspire most of Churchill's traditions. Hougaard is credited with establishing the name of the school and its affiliation to Winston Churchill and his family, and the school mascot, the bulldog. The school was established using the name Eastlea Boys High School and operated at Roosevelt Girls High for the first two terms while a block was being built at Eastlea Boys High. It happened then that the headmaster, Mr. Hougaard, wrote to the then Prime Minister of the United Kingdom, Sir Winston Spencer Churchill, to rename the Eastlea Boys High School after him and the permission was granted. Since then the school has been known as Churchill School.

Houses
Two boarding houses, which had about 180 pupils, were named Winston and Spencer houses. The games houses (Akroyd, Beaumont, Cardell, Hamilton, Maxwell and Wakeham) recall pilots who died in the Battle of Britain. These houses compete in sports and cultural activities for the prestigious Governor's Cup.

Sport
The school offers a number of sporting disciplines such as rugby, baseball, hockey, cricket, basketball, tennis, soccer, water polo, volleyball, golf, swimming, athletics, cross country, squash, chess and, at one time, shooting. It has a very passionate sporting culture which has been carried on for generations. It is regarded as one of Zimbabwe's best sporting schools and competes for top honours with Harare's other big sporting schools, mainly St George's College, St John's College and Prince Edward School. The bulldogs hold a top ten spot in every sporting discipline that they offer.

Their cricket team is the most successful high school cricket team in Zimbabwe as it has held the number one spot in Zimbabwe's Schools Cricket One Day League and has produced players like Prosper Utseya, Hamilton Masakadza, Tatenda Taibu, Elton Chigumbura, Douglas Hondo and Lameck Mufambisi.

Their baseball team was ranked as one of the best teams in Zimbabwe since 2015. The team has produced top players In the sport including Joel Tenderere, Cuthbert Nyamangara, Ashlon Chibvuri, Courage Chaibva and Tafadzwa Kasiyamhuru who have all managed to play for Zimbabwe's first team. 
 
Their soccer team is also one of the most popular teams in the country and has gone on to produce soccer stars such as Samson Choruwa, Norman Maroto and Eddie Mashiri.

The volleyball team has also been the backbone of the Churchill pride, being the best team in the country. Their glory is credited from more than 5 years of an undefeated streak of the 2006 to 2011 era. During this period national team players like  Nyasha (Rasnas) Takawira, Tatenda (Nhapsy) Mapigoti, Tawanda (Dzugi) Pamire, Misheck Mutambirwa, Tawanda (Pladzva) Mafuwa to mention a few came out of the great institution Churchill. It was the first school to form a schools club volleyball team that competed in the national volleyball league of Zimbabwe, and crown the national clubs champions 2006–8. 
In 2008 Churchill Volleyball team toured Toowoomba, Australia for schools cup and finished second in division 1 and was always in the top three of the league. Churchill become Zimbabwe volleyball power house directed by Head Coach Mr. Arron Mutede who joined Churchill in 1999. It is popularly known as the Bulldogs Volleyball.

The rugby team, which is popularly known as the bulldogs, enjoys a relative amount of success and like the cricket team, is highly rated. It is the most important team in the school and has also produced excellent rugby players, namely Tendai Mtawarira, Tangai Nemadire, Jed, Shingie, Sibanda, Madondo, Dan Hondo,  and Bryan Taylor of the then Rhodesia Boys' U21 1st XV and captain of the school's 1st XV (1960).

Boxer Derek Chisora attended during the 1990s and went on to fight for a World title.

See also

 List of schools in Zimbabwe
 List of boarding schools

References

Schools in Harare
Boarding schools in Zimbabwe
Day schools in Zimbabwe
Boys' schools in Zimbabwe
Boys' high schools in Zimbabwe
High schools in Zimbabwe
Educational institutions established in 1950
1950 establishments in Southern Rhodesia